Jaime Julián García Añoveros (24 January 1932 – 15 March 2000) was a Spanish politician from the Union of the Democratic Centre (UCD) who served as Minister of Finance from April 1979 to December 1982.

References

Government ministers of Spain
20th-century Spanish politicians
Economy and finance ministers of Spain
1932 births
2000 deaths
University of Valencia alumni
University of Bologna alumni